Water onion is a common name for several plants and may refer to:

 Eleocharis dulcis, native to Asia, tropical Africa, and Oceania
 Crinum species
 Zephyranthes species